"Still Taking Chances" is a song written and recorded by American country music artist Michael Martin Murphey. It was released in November 1982 as the third single from the album Michael Martin Murphey. The song peaked at number 3 on the U.S. Billboard Hot Country Singles in early 1983 and number 76 on the U.S. Billboard Hot 100.

Chart performance

References

1982 songs
1982 singles
Michael Martin Murphey songs
Songs written by Michael Martin Murphey
Liberty Records singles